Kenji Eto (born 22 January 1948) is a Japanese equestrian. He competed in two events at the 1976 Summer Olympics.

References

1948 births
Living people
Japanese male equestrians
Olympic equestrians of Japan
Equestrians at the 1976 Summer Olympics
Place of birth missing (living people)